El rapto  is a Mexican telenovela produced by Telesistema Mexicano in 1960. with episodes of 30 minutes duration. Directed by Jesús Valero. Starring Cesareo Quezada and antagonized by René Cardona. The telenovela had a certain point the suspense.

Cast 
 Cesareo Quezada
 Carmen Montejo
 René Cardona
 Andrea Palma
 Luis Manuel Pelayo

References

External links 
 Página de alma-latina.net

1960 telenovelas
Mexican telenovelas
Televisa telenovelas
Television shows set in Mexico City
1960 Mexican television series debuts
1960 Mexican television series endings
Spanish-language telenovelas